Khan Nahr (also Romanized as Khān Nahr; also known as Khān Nar) is a village in Qotbabad Rural District, Kordian District, Jahrom County, Fars Province, Iran. At the 2006 census, its population was 31, in 7 families.

References 

Populated places in Jahrom County